Ciresi is a surname. Notable people with the surname include:

Joe Ciresi (born 1970), American politician
Michael V. Ciresi, American lawyer
Rita Ciresi (born 1961), American short story writer and novelist of Italian descent